Gwanak District (Gwanak-gu) is an administrative subdivision (gu) of Seoul, South Korea. It lies on the southern skirt of Seoul, bordering Anyang of Gyeonggi Province. The southern border of Gwanak-gu, bordering Anyang, consists of the craggy ridgeline of Gwanaksan (Mt. Gwanak), which dominates the local geography.

Originally a part of Siheung, Gyeonggi, it was transferred to Seoul with the rapid expansion of the National Capital Area and its population growth in 1960s. Partitioned from Yeongdeungpo District and established as a district in 1973, it now neighbours the Seocho, Dongjak, Guro, and Geumcheon Districts, and exercises jurisdiction over 21 neighbourhoods (dong), with a population of 500,000.

Overview
Gwanak District is densely populated with over 500,000 people. While it was once a rural area dominated by the presence of Gwanaksan (Mt. Gwanak), population booms in the late 1950s and early 1960s, accompanied by rapid industrialization of the capital area, quickly changed the town into a mosaic of dense residential and industrial areas. Large slum quarters were formed by migrant populations from all over Korea who sought jobs in industrialized Seoul. A series of redevelopment projects starting in the 1970's, and the relocation of Seoul National University to the district, led to a reduction of slum quarters and indigent textile industries and transformed the town into a residential uptown neighborhood of Seoul. The area is also heavily populated by university students from surrounding provinces.

Commercial zones
Central commercial zones include the Seorim and Daehak area and the Cheongnyong area near Seoul National University. These areas also form a large zone of private dormitories and small houses, which primarily target university students and national examination takers (gosi-saeng) looking for an environment that is favorable for studying. Restaurants, supermarkets, bars and pubs in the area are centered in Nokdu Street (Nokdu-geori) in the Daehak area and near Seoul National University Station. Other commercial zones for residents are located along the Nambu Beltway and two main roads.

The main shopping district, the Bongcheon Central Market (Bongcheon-jungang-sijang), is positioned in Jungang Neighbourhood, north from Seoul National University Station.

Transportation
Nambu Beltway, which circles Seoul, passes through the very center of the district. The beltway and two main avenues, Gwanak Road (Gwanak-ro) and Sillim Road (Sillim-ro), make the main route of the automobile traffic. Nambu Beltway is connected to multiple express ways.

Public transportation
Green Line (Line 2) and Blue Line (Line 4) of Seoul Metro links Gwanak District and other areas. Many trunk (painted in blue) buses such as 501, 506, 651 and 750 lines, and branch (in green) buses in 5XXX or X5XX line passes Gwanak area.

Metro stations
Seoul Metro (Seoul Metropolitan Rapid Transit Corporation)
Seoul Subway Line 2 (Green Line)
(Dongjak) ← Nakseongdae — Bongcheon — Sillim → (Dongjak)
Seoul Subway Line 4 (Blue Line)
(Dongjak) ← Sadang → (Seocho)

Administrative divisions

There are three statutory subdivisions: Sillim, Bongcheon and Namhyeon Neighbourhood. Those are further divided into multiple administrative neighbourhoods (dong) to balance excessive populations and for administrative expedience. As of September 2008, there are 21 administrative neighbourhoods in Gwanak District.

Points of interest

 Seoul National University
 Kyujanggak Archives
 Seoul National University Museum of Art
 Seoul Museum of Art, South Branch (SeMA Nam-Seoul)
 Former Belgian Consulate Building
 Horim Museum
 Nokdu Street
 Nakseongdae
 Anguk Shrine
 Gwanaksan (Mt. Gwanak)
 Gwaneum-sa Buddhist Temple (in Gwanaksan Park)

Sister cities
  Daxing, Beijing, China
  Tiexi, Shenyang, China
  Royal Kingston, London, United Kingdom
  Montgomery County, Pennsylvania, United States of America

Notable people from Gwanak District
 Gang Gam-chan (Hangul: 강감찬), Korean medieval government official and military commander during the early days of Goryeo Dynasty 
 Yang Jungwon (Hangul: 정원), singer, dancer and K-pop idol, leader and member of K-pop boygroup ENHYPEN
 Solji (Real Name: Heo Sol-ji, Hangul: 허솔지), singer, dancer, model and K-pop idol, leader and member of K-pop girlgroup EXID and former member of ballad duo group 2NB
 Taeyong (Real Name: Lee Tae-yong, Hangul: 이태용), singer-songwriter, rapper, dancer and K-pop idol, leader and member of K-pop boygroup NCT, of its subunits NCT U and NCT 127 and member of the K-pop superboygroup Super M

See also
 Geography of South Korea
 Gwanaksan
 Seoul National University
 Nokdu Street
 Nakseongdae

References

External links

 Official English website

 
1973 establishments in South Korea
Districts of Seoul